In mechanical engineering, a parallel force system is a situation in which two forces of equal magnitude act in the same direction within the same plane, with the counter force in the middle.  An example of this is a see saw.  The children are applying the two forces at the ends, and the fulcrum in the middle gives the counter force to maintain the see saw in neutral position.  Another example are the major vertical forces on an airplane in flight (see image at right).

References

 
 

Force
Classical mechanics
Mechanics
Mechanical engineering